Shumrovaty is a rural locality (a khutor) in Kuybyshevskoye Rural Settlement, Sredneakhtubinsky District, Volgograd Oblast, Russia. The population was 63 as of 2010. There are 5 streets.

Geography 
Shumrovaty is located 13 km south of Srednyaya Akhtuba (the district's administrative centre) by road. Sukhodol is the nearest rural locality.

References 

Rural localities in Sredneakhtubinsky District